Shmuel Avital (born 24 May 1951) is a former Israeli politician who served as a minister without portfolio responsible for social co-ordination from March 2001 until February 2002.

Biography
Born in Casablanca in Morocco, Avital made aliyah to Israel in 1953. He studied at Ben-Gurion University of the Negev in Beersheba and worked in agriculture.

In 1992 he was elected to the Knesset on the Labor Party's list. However, he lost his seat in the 1996 elections. Despite not being a member of the Knesset, in March 2001 he was appointed minister without portfolio responsible for social co-ordination in Ariel Sharon's national unity government. However, he resigned in February the following year.

References

External links
 

1951 births
Moroccan emigrants to France
20th-century Moroccan Jews
People from Casablanca
Government ministers of Israel
Living people
Israeli Labor Party politicians
Members of the 13th Knesset (1992–1996)